The Cathedral of St. Philip, also San Felipe Cathedral, is a parish of the Roman Catholic Church in San Felipe, Valparaíso, Chile which serves as the cathedral church of the Diocese of San Felipe de Aconcagua.

Founded in 1740, with the foundation of the city, as the main church of Aconcagua, it is situated in front of the Plaza de Armas. Its first pastor was Doctor Don José de Rojas y Ovalle. In 1845, Don José de los Dolores Villarroel undertook the reconstruction of the parish church, relying exclusively on the support of parishioners, and the work was completed in 1850.

The church of St. Philip was made the episcopal seat with the erection of the Diocese of San Felipe in 1925.

See also
Catholic Church in Chile

References

Roman Catholic cathedrals in Chile
Roman Catholic churches completed in 1850
Religious organizations established in 1740
Buildings and structures in Valparaíso Region
19th-century Roman Catholic church buildings in Chile